Dominique Marie Jean Rey (born 21 September 1952) is the Bishop of Fréjus-Toulon in the province of Marseille in southern France. He is a member of the Emmanuel Community, and he is considered one of the more conservative French bishops. He also frequently celebrates Tridentine Mass. This has brought him under pressure from the Vatican in its campaign to suppress the Tridentine rite along with the theology associated with it.

Biography
Rey was born in Saint-Étienne on 21 September 1952. He served as curé of Ste. Trinité church in Paris from 1995 to 2000. 

On 16 May 2000, Pope John Paul II appointed him Bishop of Fréjus-Toulon. He received his episcopal consecration on 17 September 2000 from Cardinal Jean-Marie Lustiger.

On 18 September 2012, Bishop Rey was appointed by Pope Benedict XVI to participate in the October 2012 
13th Ordinary General Assembly of the Synod of Bishops on the New Evangelization.

He is the author of a book that argues that being a Catholic and a Freemason are incompatible.

In June 2013, he organized a four-day conference on sacred liturgy at the Pontifical University of the Holy Cross in Rome.

On 6 February 2014, Pope Francis named him a consultor to the Pontifical Council for the Laity. 

In August 2015, breaking with the policy of the Conference of French Bishops, he invited Marion Maréchal-Le Pen a prominent National Front member of the French parliament, to participate on a panel of politicians in his diocese. Rey defended the invitation: "The FN is a party like any other on the political chessboard. You have to be realistic, don't cover your eyes and ears!"

Within the Bishop's Conference of France he is a member of the episcopal finance commission.

Notes

Distinctions
 Prelate Grand Cross of the Order of Saint Lazarus (statuted 1910) (2017).

References

1952 births
Living people
People from Saint-Étienne
21st-century Roman Catholic bishops in France